Nikolay Zhechev (born 22 October 1974) is a former Bulgarian footballer and currently manager of Nesebar.

Career

Zhechev's teams include Nesebar and Chernomorets Burgas.

References

External links
 

Bulgarian footballers
Association football defenders
Association football midfielders
FC Chernomorets Burgas players
PFC Nesebar players
Second Professional Football League (Bulgaria) players
First Professional Football League (Bulgaria) players
1974 births
Living people